Ormetica contraria is a moth of the family Erebidae. It was described by Francis Walker in 1854. It is found in French Guiana, Guyana, Brazil, Ecuador, Peru and Bolivia.

Subspecies
Ormetica contraria contraria (Brazil)
Ormetica contraria peruviana (Rothschild, 1922) (Peru)

References

Ormetica
Moths described in 1854